Constitution Club of India  is a club started for members of Indian Constituent Assembly. In present days the Constitution Club acts as a platform for interaction amongst the past and present Members of Parliament. The club is registered under the Societies Registration Act 1860.

History
The club was established as an informal group in year 1947 housed at Curzon Road. It was formally inaugurated by Shri Sarvapalli Radhakrishnan, philosopher & academician President in February 1965. At the present location Constitution Club of India is Vithal Bhai Patel House.

Memorandum
Whereas the Constitution Club of India was opened in February 1947 with the objectives & purposes of fostering social contacts and providing usual amenities of a club life for the benefit of the members of the Indian Constituent Assembly. AND WHEREAS the Constitution Club of India has effectively emerged as an enviable forum providing platform for interaction amongst the Past & Present member of Parliament. And whereas it has been found expedient to constitute a Society for the furtherance of its main aims and objectives. NOW Therefore, we the Signatories to this Memorandum of Association have agreed to form this society by the name "Constitution Club of India" hereinafter referred as Club and to register it under the Societies Registration Act 1860.

After independence 
After the Independence, the Club has emerged as a platform for exhibitions, vital meetings, events, press conferences, elite parties & social hangouts between the present and former Members of Parliament.

President, Vice-President & Elected Governing Council

President, Vice-Presidents & General Secretary 
Smt. Sumitra Mahajan, Hon'ble  Speaker Lok Sabha, President. She is the 16th Speaker of Lok Sabha. Shri P. J. Kurien, Hon'ble ex-Deputy Chairman, Rajya Sabha & Shri Hardeep Singh Puri, Hon'ble Minister of State (Independent Charge) for Housing and Urban Affairs, are the Vice President. Shri M. Thambidurai, Hon'ble Deputy Speaker Lok Sabha is the General Secretary.

Elected Governing Council 
Shri Rajiv Pratap Rudy as Secretary (Administration), Shri Rajiv Shukla as Secretary (Sports), Shri Madhu G Yaskhi as Secretary (Culture), Shri Om Birla as Treasurer. Other Executive Members of the Club are Shri A P Jithender Reddy, Dr Sanjay Jaiswal, Shri Praful Patel, Shri D Raja, Shri Kalikesh Singh Deo, Shri Sandeep Dikshit, Shri Vivek Gupta, Shri Satish C Mishra, Shri Naveen Jindal & Shri Anurag Singh Thakur. Director of Constitution Club of India is Shri Arvind Kumar.

Facilities 
 Conference Rooms
 Coffee Shop
 Billiards Room
 Gym
 Unisex Salon 
 Swimming Pool
 Badminton Hall
 Cosy Leisure Lounges

References

External links 
 
 

Organisations based in Delhi
Clubs and societies in India
Organizations established in 1947
1947 establishments in India